Julian Noa Wasserman (June 8, 1948 – June 4, 2003) was an American scholar of English, having been a Provost Distinguished Professor at Loyola University, New Orleans.

References

1948 births
2003 deaths
Loyola University New Orleans faculty